Kępa Świeszyńska is a settlement in the administrative district of Gmina Świeszyno, within Koszalin County, West Pomeranian Voivodeship, in north-western Poland. 

For the history of the region, see History of Pomerania. The settlement has a population of 57.

References

Villages in Koszalin County